Pycnostachys is a genus of plants in the family Lamiaceae, first described in 1826. It is native to sub-Saharan Africa including Madagascar.

Species
 Pycnostachys abyssinica Fresen. - Ethiopia
 Pycnostachys angolensis G.Taylor - Angola
 Pycnostachys batesii Baker - Cameroon, Zaïre, Sudan, Uganda 
 Pycnostachys chevalieri Briq. - Central African Republic
 Pycnostachys ciliata Bramley - Tanzania, Malawi, Mozambique, Zambia
 Pycnostachys coerulea Hook. - East Africa from Ethiopia to Botswana; Madagascar
 Pycnostachys congensis Gürke - Zaïre, Zambia
 Pycnostachys de-wildemaniana Robyns & Lebrun  - East Africa from Burundi to Zimbabwe
 Pycnostachys deflexifolia Baker  - Kenya, Tanzania, Uganda
 Pycnostachys descampsii Briq. - Zaïre
 Pycnostachys elliotii S.Moore - Zaïre, Uganda
 Pycnostachys eminii Gürke - from Cameroon to Ethiopia + Tanzania
 Pycnostachys erici-rosenii R.E.Fr - Zaïre, Uganda, Burundi, Rwanda
 Pycnostachys goetzenii Gürke - Zaïre, Uganda, Rwanda
 Pycnostachys gracilis R.D.Good - Angola
 Pycnostachys graminifolia Perkins - Tanzania
 Pycnostachys kassneri De Wild - Zaïre, Zambia, Tanzania
 Pycnostachys lancifolia Bramley - Tanzania
 Pycnostachys meyeri Gürke - western + central Africa
 Pycnostachys nepetifolia Baker  - Kenya
 Pycnostachys niamniamensis Gürke - South Sudan, Kenya, Uganda
 Pycnostachys orthodonta Gürke  - Zimbabwe, Mozambique, Zambia, Tanzania
 Pycnostachys parvifolia Baker - Zambia, Tanzania, Malawi
 Pycnostachys prittwitzii Perkins - Zambia, Tanzania
 Pycnostachys pseudospeciosa Buscal. & Muschl. - Zaïre, Zambia
 Pycnostachys recurvata Ryding - Ethiopia 
 Pycnostachys reticulata (E.Mey.) Benth. - central + southern Africa
 Pycnostachys ruandensis De Wild. - east-central Africa
 Pycnostachys schliebenii Mildbr. - east-central Africa
 Pycnostachys schweinfurthii Briq - western + central Africa
 Pycnostachys speciosa Gürke - Kenya, Uganda, Tanzania, Rwanda
 Pycnostachys sphaerocephala Baker - Zambia, Tanzania, Malawi, Zaïre
 Pycnostachys stuhlmannii Gürke - central Africa
 Pycnostachys umbrosa (Vatke) Perkins - Kenya, Tanzania
 Pycnostachys urticifolia Hook. - southeastern Africa
 Pycnostachys verticillata Baker - Zambia, Tanzania

References

Lamiaceae
Lamiaceae genera